Anti-Austrian sentiment (also known as Austrophobia) refers to hostile sentiment toward the nation of Austria and/or its people.

In the English-speaking world,  Anti-Austrian sentiment is sometimes associated with an Anti-German sentiment. Articles in the Daily Mail regularly advocated anti-German sentiments throughout the 20th century, telling their readers to refuse service at restaurants by Austrian or German waiters on the claim that they were spies. The newspaper also told its readers that if a German-sounding waiter claimed to be Swiss, then they should demand to see the waiter's passport.

References

 
 
 

Austrian
Austria
Foreign relations of Austria